The Auckland Rugby League (ARL) is the governing body for the sport of rugby league in the Auckland Region of New Zealand including both club, school, and representative league.

History
Auckland first played some unofficial representative matches in 1908 before an organisational body was officially formed on July 19 in 1909 at the Chamber of Commerce on Swanson Street after players had met a week earlier on July 12. North Shore Albions were the first club to form on July 23 and then Ponsonby United, City Rovers, and Newton Rangers were formed over the following days and weeks with many of the players dissatisfied with the Auckland Rugby Union at the time. The first organised club match was played on July 25 between North Shore Albions and City Rovers at Eagleton's Paddock in Epsom with North Shore winning 44-24. The first full club season was played in 1910 and featured 4 teams, Newton Rangers, City Rovers, Ponsonby United, and North Shore Albions.

The Auckland Rugby League was once recognised by England's Northern Rugby Football Union as New Zealand's governing body for the game of rugby league.

In 2009, the ARL celebrated its centenary.

Club competitions

Auckland's premier competition is the Fox Memorial Shield. This has been contested since 1910.

Senior Competition
The Fox Memorial competition for 2022 has been shortened due to covid. It will be played over 13 weekends following a later start date (May 7). There will be 2 sections with 10 teams in each. The top 6 teams will progress to the Fox Premiership after 9 rounds and play an additional 4 matches before the playoffs. The 2 sections are as follows.

Junior clubs
Other clubs only run junior programmes. These include Kaipara Lancers, Rodney Rams, Pukekohe Pythons & Tuakau, Waiheke Rams and Waiuku.

Clubs

Bay Roskill Vikings
East Coast Bays Barracudas 
Ellerslie Eagles
Glenfield Greyhounds 
Glenora Bears
Hibiscus Coast Raiders
Howick Hornets
Kaipara
Mangere East Hawks
Manukau Magpies
Manurewa Marlins
Marist Saints
Mount Albert Lions
Mount Wellington Warriors
New Lynn Stags
Northcote Tigers
Northshore/Navy
Otahuhu Leopards
Otara Scorpions
Pakuranga Jaguars
Papakura Sea Eagles
Papatoetoe Panthers
Point Chevalier Pirates
Ponsonby Ponies
Pukekohe Pythons
Richmond Bulldogs
Rodney Rams
Te Atatu Roosters
Tuakau
Waiheke Rams
Waitemata Seagulls
Waiuku

Defunct or merged clubs
City Rovers and Newton Rangers merged in the early 1900s. City Newton Dragons later merged with Point Chevalier to become 'City-Pt Chevalier'. Later the two clubs separated, and then in 2004 City Newton folded, while Point Chevalier remained. Ponsonby United and Maritime merged to become Ponsonby-Maritime, they parted ways in 1983 and Ponsonby are still in existence. Navy merged with North Shore to become 'Navy/North Shore' however North Shore ceased to exist in 2009. 

Other teams to cease as their own entities include:

Akarana
Avondale
Big Store (1918)
Blockhouse Bay
Coromandel Old Boys (1922-)
Eden Ramblers (1911-13)
Eden Roskill
Glen Eden
Glen Innes
Grafton Athletic (1914-22)
Green Lane
Hobsonville Pirates (1912-14)
Ihumatao (1922-)
Kaipara
Kingsland Rovers/Athletic (1920-31)
Leys Institute (1924-)
Mangere Rangers (1915-)
Manukau-Greenlane (which was a merged side)
Maritime Football Club (1918-30)
Mt Roskill
New Lynn (1924-)
Pupuke (1917-)
Panmure
Parnell (1918-)
R.V. (1935-) (a company club of the Harvey & Sons Ltd business ('R.V.' was a play on the name 'Harvey') which later became a part of the Carter Holt Harvey company)
Riverhead (1916-)
Remuera (1914-28)
Sunnyside Club (1914-19)
Takapuna (1921-)
Manukau Cruising Club
Telegraph Messengers (1917-)
United Suburbs (1924-)
Thames Old Boys (1915-)
University
Victoria Cruising Club (1923-)
Wesley
Zora
Western United
Eastern United
Southern Districts
Northern Districts

Senior club trophies
The Fox Memorial is awarded to the grand final winner in the Premiership.  In 2022 the 19 competing teams are split into 2 sections. After playing each other the top 6 in each section moved into the Fox Premiership play offs.

For a list of the major trophies awarded in Auckland club rugby league go to Auckland Club Rugby League Trophies (this includes player awards as well as team awards).

Past decade winners:

Roope Rooster
The Roope Rooster is currently held by the Point Chevalier Pirates who went through the 2022 season undefeated in all home challenges.

National competitions

Lion Red Cup
When the Lion Red Cup was started in 1994 Auckland was originally represented by four teams. The Auckland City Vulcans, The Waitakere City Raiders, The Counties Manukau Heroes and the North Harbour Sea Eagles. In 1995 the Vulcans were replaced by the Auckland Warriors Colts. In 1996 Auckland City did not compete.
 North Harbour won the competition in 1994 & 1995.
 Counties-Manukau won the competition in 1996 and was runner up in 1994.
 Auckland was runner up in 1995 & Waitakere was runner up in 1996.

Bartercard Cup/Premiership
Previously Auckland had a large representation in the Bartercard Cup, in its final seasons before it ceased to run Auckland was represented by the Auckland Lions, Waitakere Rangers, Harbour League, Counties Manukau Jetz and the Tamaki Titans.
 The Mt Albert Lions won in 2002, 2004 & 2005.
 The Hibiscus Coast Raiders won in 2001.
 The Auckland Lions won in 2006 & 2007.

With the folding of the Bartercard Cup, Auckland rugby league team was awarded a place in the new six-team Bartercard Premiership, beginning in 2008. In 2009 the competition was mirrored by Under 18 and Under 16 grade competitions. The competition was replaced by the seven-team National Zonal Competition in 2010. Effectively Auckland club rugby league reverted to its regular form, with the zonal competition representing regional representative teams as in the past.

Representative team

Auckland has played against several touring teams over the years though once the Auckland Warriors started playing in 1995 it diluted the standard of the side and they have not played against full international sides in recent years.

Auckland famously beat Australia, England and France in the space of 21 days in 1977.  A feat which the New Zealand Warriors commemorated by wearing replica strips in their Round 24 clash with the Manly Sea Eagles on 26 August 2007, when the Warriors won 36–14 in front of a packed Mount Smart Stadium.

Auckland also beat the touring Australian side in 1989 by 26 points to 24 at Carlaw Park.

Auckland represented New Zealand for most years in the Australian midweek competition (see Amco Cup) in the 1970s and 1980s. Central Districts, Canterbury, Wellington, and South Island also fielded teams .

Auckland representative sides traditionally wear a blue jersey with a white double 'V', in the same style of the New Zealand national rugby league team jersey but with blue instead of black, this is still the jersey worn by the Auckland Vulcans NSW Cup team (see below).

Auckland Warriors
Auckland Rugby League originally owned the Auckland Warriors (now known as New Zealand Warriors) when they were entered into the 1995 Winfield Cup, run by the Australian Rugby League. The club is based at Ericsson Stadium. By 1998 the club had yet to experience any success and so was sold to a consortium including the Tainui tribe.

Players Of Note
 Manu Vatuvei - NZ Warriors
Jason Taumalolo - North Queensland Cowboys
Shaun Johnson - NZ Warriors
Tuimoala Lolohea - NZ Warriors
Ruben Wiki - Canberra Raiders 
Sam Kasiano - Canterbury Bulldogs
Sosaia Feki - Cronulla-Sutherland Sharks
Thomas Leuluai - NZ Warriors
Ben Henry - NZ Warriors
Ben Te'o - South Sydney Rabbitohs
Steve Matai- Manly-Warringah Sea Eagles
Raymond Faitala-Mariner - Canterbury Bulldogs
Sonny Bill Williams - Sydney Roosters
Bunty Afoa - New Zealand Warriors
Isaac Liu - Gold Coast Titans
Kieran Foran - Manly Sea Eagles
Erin Clark - Gold coast Titans
Sio Siua Taukeiaho - Sydney Roosters
Jesse Bromwich - Melbourne Storm 
Kenny Bromwich - Melbourne Storm

See also

Rugby league in New Zealand
List of NRL club owners

References

External links
 Official site

Rugby league in Auckland
Rugby league governing bodies in New Zealand